Acanthotrema is a genus of lichens in the family Graphidaceae. The genus was circumscribed by German lichenologist Andreas Frisch in 2006, with Acanthotrema brasilianum assigned as the type species.

Species
Acanthotrema alboisidiatum 
Acanthotrema bicellulare 
Acanthotrema brasilianum 
Acanthotrema frischii 
Acanthotrema kalbii 
Acanthotrema minus  – Brazil

References

Graphidaceae
Lichen genera
Ostropales genera
Taxa described in 2006